Marios Kapotsis (born 13 September 1991) is a Greek water polo player. He is part of Greece men's national water polo team that competes at the 2017 World Aquatics Championships in Budapest.

At club level, Kapotsis currently plays for NC Vouliagmeni. From 2012 to 2014 he played for Olympiacos, with whom he won 2 Greek Championships and 2 Greek Cups.

In August 2021, he won the silver medal with Greece in the water polo tournament at the 2020 Summer Olympics.

See also
 Greece at the 2017 World Aquatics Championships

References

1991 births
Greek male water polo players
Olympiacos Water Polo Club players
Living people
Mediterranean Games medalists in water polo
Mediterranean Games silver medalists for Greece
Competitors at the 2018 Mediterranean Games
Water polo players at the 2020 Summer Olympics
Medalists at the 2020 Summer Olympics
Olympic silver medalists for Greece
Olympic medalists in water polo
Olympic water polo players of Greece
Water polo players from Athens
21st-century Greek people